Facundo Ospitaleche Hernández (born 11 April 1996 in Montevideo, Uruguay) is an Uruguayan professional footballer who plays for River Plate in Primera División Uruguaya on loan from Defensor Sporting.

References

External links
 
 

Living people
1996 births
Uruguayan footballers
Uruguay youth international footballers
Uruguayan expatriate footballers
Uruguayan Primera División players
Ascenso MX players
Defensor Sporting players
Club Atlético River Plate (Montevideo) players
Venados F.C. players
Expatriate footballers in Mexico
Uruguayan expatriate sportspeople in Mexico
Association football midfielders